Spokane, Portland and Seattle Railway Class L-5 was a class of 4-4-0 steam locomotives built in 1897 by Schenectady Locomotive Works.

References 

L-5
4-4-0 locomotives
Schenectady Locomotive Works locomotives
Steam locomotives of the United States
Standard gauge locomotives of the United States
Railway locomotives introduced in 1897